“Say Yes” is a short story written by Tobias Wolff in 1985. This story is about a husband and wife discussing the issues of interracial marriage. While she feels that race should not be a factor when marrying someone, he disagrees, saying, “how can you understand someone who comes from a completely different background?” The couple's discussion confronts the theories on identity, race, and love.

Themes
The themes of the story revolve around knowledge of self and others, as well as the nature of self within romantic relationships.  

The story is ironic. The husband says interracial couples should not marry because they have no hope of understanding each other. He ironically fails to see that he and Ann are having a hopeless failure to understand each other at the very same moment.

The husband is also left nameless by the author, emphasizing his lack of self-knowledge, and Ann’s inability to understand or truly know him.

Just as his views on interracial marriage reduce complex humans to simple colors that can never know each other, his failure to connect with his wife, in the end, reduces her to a simple color moving through the dark. With the story's final words, she becomes “a stranger” to him.

The ending suggests that both Ann and her husband are correct. The husband is correct that interracial couples can never truly know one another, but only because no one in any marriage can ever truly know their spouse. Ann, by this logic, is also correct that interracial couples should be allowed to marry, as their marriages are no more hopeless than any other couple.

Characters
The characters of this story are Ann and her husband, who remains unnamed. Ann is upset with her husband for his views on interracial marriage. They argue while carelessly doing the dishes. When she becomes upset by his admittance that he would not marry her if she were black, she responds by becoming indifferent, flipping slowly through a magazine. The husband must act similarly. The husband views himself as considerate, for he often helps around the house, but he isn't too concerned if his opinions hurt his wife or if she thinks they're rather stupid. He expects the matter to be dropped when he comes to her aid after she's cut her thumb. He is seen as a less than genuine person, doing things out of effect rather than sincere desire. Closer to the end of the story, he begins to feel overwhelmed with thoughts of love for his wife, and when he returns from taking out the garbage, he tells her he would marry her no matter what. He waits for a response but is given none. And he waits alone in bed for her, while it seems to him she has become a stranger.

References

American short stories